Sympistis doris is a moth of the family Noctuidae first described by Thomas E. Dimock and James T. Troubridge in 2008. It is found in California.

The wingspan is about 30 mm.

References

doris
Moths of North America
Endemic fauna of California
Moths described in 2008
Fauna without expected TNC conservation status